The Network Test Automation Forum (NTAF), founded in 2010, is a nonprofit international industry alliance, dedicated to promoting interoperability of commercial network testing tools and testing infrastructure, by defining and facilitating adoption of technical specifications.

The forum is composed of leading service providers, network equipment vendors, and other networking companies that share an interest in test automation and interoperability. As of November 2012, it has 14 members.

History
In 2009, 11 founding members (BreakingPoint, BT, Cisco, Fanfare, Empirix, Ericsson, EXFO, Ixia, JDSU, Spirent and Verizon) met in Chicago and expressed an interest in forming an industry alliance to bring together commercial testing vendors, test equipment vendors, and other industry experts to create interoperable testing solutions for service providers, network equipment manufacturers (NEMs), and other enterprise organizations with large network deployments. The result was the Network Test Automation Forum entity, which was set up in 2010 following the first face-to-face meeting in Montreal.

Goal
To facilitate and promote the interoperability of commercial testing tools and test infrastructure for the data communications and telecommunications industry.

NTAF will bring together commercial testing vendors, test equipment vendors, and other industry experts to create interoperable testing solutions for service providers, network equipment manufacturers (NEMs), and other enterprise organizations with large network deployments.

Objectives
The objectives of NTAF are:
 Build consensus and unite service providers, network equipment manufacturers, and test equipment vendors on network test automation technical specifications and interoperability.
 Create, facilitate and enable the implementation of network test automation specifications.
 Enhance market awareness of the benefits of interoperable network test automation.

Members
As of July 2013, NTAF has the following members:
 Cisco
 Empirix
 Ericsson
 JDSU
 Huawei
 Juniper Networks
 MRV
 Spirent Communications
 TechMahindra
 Verizon

Specifications
In June 2011, NTAF ratified two sets of specifications dealing with registration, discovery and activation of tools and defining tool harnesses.

TS-001: Tool Registration, Discovery and Activation
This specification describes an XMPP extension that allows an application or tool to register itself in a way that other interested entities can discover its existence. It also describes the mechanism by which a tool can be activated so that its automation harnesses are available for use.

TS-002: Tool Automation Harness
This specification describes an XMPP extension that allows an application or tool, with or without its own specialized man-machine user interface to expose an "automation harness" that allows that tool to be controlled and/or monitored by another tool via XMPP packet exchanges.

Future Direction
The NTAF Technical Committee is currently working on draft specifications for resource and inventory management:

WT-003: Tool Resource
This working document describes an NTAF extension that allows tools to communicate resource data. It is based on the TS-001 and TS-002 specifications. Its primary focus is to support automated inventory management.

WT-004: Inventory
This working document describes an NTAF extension that supports the automatic population of inventory records with key equipment/resource parameters within a test lab environment. It is based on the TS-001 and TS002 specifications and the WT-003 proposal.

References

Technology consortia
Standards organizations in the United States
Automation organizations
Organizations based in Alameda County, California
Organizations based in Fremont, California
BT Group
Cisco Systems
Ericsson
Verizon Communications